Daphna Kastner (born April 17, 1961) is a Canadian film and television actress, screenwriter, and film director. She is married to American actor Harvey Keitel.

Personal life
She and Harvey Keitel secretly married in Jerusalem, while attending the Haifa International Film Festival. In October 2001 they had their official ceremony at the Manhattan home of Keitel's friend, Ian Eckersley. They have a son.

Selected filmography
 1983 The Lonely Lady
 1986 Evixion
 1989 Girlfriend from Hell
 1990 Eating
 1991 Crack Me Up
 1991 Julia Has Two Lovers
 1991 Lana in Love
 1992 Venice/Venice
 1995 French Exit
 1996 Kiss & Tell
 1998 Spanish Fly
 2000 Timecode
 2001 Eden
 2007 My Sexiest Year

References

External links

1961 births
Actresses from Montreal
Anglophone Quebec people
Canadian film actresses
Canadian women screenwriters
Canadian television actresses
Canadian women film directors
Film directors from Montreal
Jewish Canadian writers
Living people
Writers from Montreal
Jewish Canadian filmmakers